The Galà dei Castelli is an annual track and field meet that takes place at the Stadio Comunale Bellinzona in Bellinzona, Switzerland and is currently classified among the silver standard World Athletics Continental Tour meetings.

Meeting records

Men

Women

References

External links
Official website
Meeting records

European Athletic Association meetings